Arun is an Indian male given name from the Sanskrit language.

The following is a list of notable people with "Arun" as their first, middle or last name.

Academia, art & literature
 Arun Agrawal  (born 1962), a political scientist in the School of Natural Resources & Environment at the University of Michigan.
 Arun G. Phadke, Distinguished Professor emeritus in the Department of Electrical Engineering at Virginia Tech.
 Arun Joshi (1939–1993), an Indian writer.
 Arun K. Pati, an Indian physicist notable for his research in quantum information and computation.
 Arun Kolatkar (1932–2004), Indian poet.
 Arun Krushnaji Kamble (1953–2009), a Marathi writer and Dalit activist.
 Arun Kumar Basak, a Bangladeshi physicist and Professor Emeritus in the Department of Physics, University of Rajshahi.
 Arun Majumdar, a materials scientist, engineer and University of California, Berkeley graduate who was President Obama's nominee for Under Secretary of Energy.
 Arun Midha (born 1964), a British academic.
 Arun Mitra (1909–2000), a Bengali poet.
 Arun Nigavekar, an educationist and ex Chairperson & Vice-Chairperson of UGC.
 Arun Prakash (educator), Indian educational facility planner and recipient of the National Award for Best Principal from the President of India.
 Arun Prasad, a historian specialized in the History of Bangalore.
 Arun Rai, an Indian born American scientist.
 Arun Sarma (born 1931), a contemporary writer of Assam.
 Arun Sundararajan, is the NEC Faculty Fellow, Professor of Information, Operations & Management Sciences and Doctoral Coordinator at the Stern School of Business, NYU.
 Madhuvanti Arun, an Indian educational promoter.
 Vinod Bala Arun, a Hindi, Sanskrit and Indian Philosophy scholar.

Bureaucracy and administration
 Arun Jaitley, Union Finance Minister of India.
 Arun Bhatnagar (born 1944), former Indian Administrative Service officer.
 Arun Kumar Gupta, an Indian police officer.
 Arun Kumar Mishra (born 1955), a judge of the Supreme Court of India.
 Arun Kumar Purwar, Chairman of State Bank of India.
 Arun Kumar Singh, an Indian diplomat and Indian Ambassador to the United States.

Business
 Arun Firodia, an Indian businessman and chairman of Kinetic Group.
 Arun Katiyar, a media expert from India.
 Arun Nayar, an Indian businessman and ex-husband of Elizabeth Hurley.
 Arun Pudur, an Indian businessman, entrepreneur and investor.
 Arun Purie, an Indian businessman who is the founder-publisher and editor-in-chief of India Today.
 Arun Raha (born 1959), Executive Director and Chief Economist for the State of Washington.
 Arun Sarin (born 1954), an Indian-born American telecommunications executive.
 Arun Shourie (born 1941), an Indian journalist, author and politician.

Film, Television & Media
 Adith Arun, an Indian film actor who has appeared in Tamil and Telugu language films.
 Anil-Arun, Indian music director duo.
 Arun Alat, an Indian playback singer and musician.
 Arun Bakshi, an Indian film and television actor and singer.
 Arun Bali (born 1932), an Indian actor.
 Arun Bannerjee, an Indian Bengali film actor.
 Arun Bhatt, an Indian former film director (of Hindi and Gujarati cinema).
 Arun Chaudhary, first official videographer of the White House.
Arun Cherukavil, an Indian Malayalam film Actor. 
 Arun Date, a Marathi singer of Bhavageete.
 Arun Govil (born 1958), an Indian actor, producer and director.
 Arun Kashalkar, an Indian classical vocalist of the Agra-Gwalior Gharana.
 Arun Kaul (1933–2007), a noted Kashmiri film maker and screenwriter.
 Arun Kumar Ahuja (1917–1998), an Indian actor and producer.
 Arun Kumar Aravind (born 1977), Indian film director, editor and producer.
 Arun Maini (born 1995), British YouTuber known as Mrwhosetheboss.
 Arun Mukherjee, a noted Bengali playwright and thespian.
 Arun Muraleedharan, an Indian music composer.
 Arun Nalawade, an Indian film and theater personality.
 Arun Pandyan, an Indian actor, director, producer and politician.
 Arun Paudwal (died 1991), music composer in Bollywood in India.
 Arun Rath, a prominent radio producer and broadcast journalist.
 Arun Sagar (born 1980), Indian film actor, art director and comedian.
 Arun Saha (actor) (born 1983), a Bangladeshi actor and musician.
 Arun Sarnaik (1935–1984), an actor and singer from Kolhapur, Maharashtra, India.
 Arun Shenoy (born 1978), a composer and music producer of Indian origin, based in Singapore.
 Arun Thapa (1952–1999), Nepali singer and songwriter.
 Arun Vaidyanathan, an Indian-American film director, producer and screenwriter.
 Arun Vijay (born 1974), an Indian actor, playback singer & stunt coordinator.
 Ila Arun, Indian actress, TV personality and singer.
 M. D. Pallavi Arun, a singer from Karnataka, India.
 P. A. Arun Prasad (born 1967), an Indian film director, screenwriter and producer.
 Priya Arun, an actress in the Marathi language film industry.

Indian Armed Forces
 Arun Khetarpal (1950–1971), an officer of the Indian Army and a posthumous recipient of the Param Vir Chakra.
 Arun Prakash (born 1944), a retired Four-Star Admiral who served as the Chief of the Naval Staff of the Indian Navy.
 Arun Shridhar Vaidya (1926–1986), 13th Chief of Army Staff (CoAS) of the Indian Army.

Politics
 Arun Chandra Guha (1892–?), an Indian politician. 
 Arun Jaitley (1952–2019), a Bharatiya Janata Party politician. Minister for Finance, Corporate Affairs, Information, and Broadcasting, in the Government of India.
 Arun Kumar Sarmah (born 1956), an Indian politician and member of the 14th Lok Sabha.
 Arun Kumar (Uttar Pradesh politician) (born 1948), an Indian politician from Bareilly district.
 Arun Kumar (Bihar politician) (born 1959), an Indian politician from Bihar. 
 Arun Nehru (1944–2013), an Indian politician.
 Arun Netravali (born 1946), an Indian politician.
 Arun Pathak (Bihar politician), an Indian politician.
 Arun Pathak (Uttar Pradesh politician), an Indian politician.
 Arun Pathak (born 1975), an Indian politician.
 Arun Sao (born 1968), Indian politician from Chhattisgarh.
 Arun Singh (born 1944), Indian politician and former union minister of state for defence in the Government of India.
 Arun Singh (born 1965), Indian politician from Uttar Pradesh.
 Arun Subhashchandra Yadav (born 1974), member of 14th and 15th Lok Sabhas of India.
 Arun Verma (born 1986), an Indian politician.
 M. Arun Subramanian, Indian politician. Member of the Tamil Nadu Legislative Assembly from the Tiruttani constituency.
 Sangram Arun Jagtap, Indian politician and member of the 13th Maharashtra Legislative Assembly.
 Undavalli Aruna Kumar (born 1954), an Indian politician.

Convicted politician
 Arun Gawli (born 1955), a gangster-turned-politician in Mumbai, India.

Sports
 Arun Bhardwaj, an ultramarathon runner from New Delhi, India.
 Arun Harinath (born 1987), an English cricketer.
 Arun Karthik (born 1986), an Indian cricketer.
 Arun Khurana, an Indian former cricketer. 
 Arun Lal (cricketer, born 1985), a Pakistani first-class cricketer who plays for Quetta cricket team.
 Arun Lal (born 1955), an Indian cricketer, and a cricket commentator.
 Arun Murugesan, an Indian Weightlifter.
 Arun Muthukrishnan, an Indian motorcycle racer.
 Arun Panchia, a New Zealand field hockey player.
 Arun Poulose, an Indian cricketer.
 Arun Sharma, an Indian first-class cricketer.
 Arun Singh (cricketer), an Indian former cricketer. 
 Arun Singla, an Indian cricketer. 
 Arun Vishnu (born 1988), an Indian badminton player.
 Bharat Arun, an Indian Test cricketer.
 Subramanian Arun Prasad (born 1988), an Indian Chess Grandmaster.

Others
 Arun Arora (born 1971), British Anglican priest and former Director of Communications of the Church of England
 Arun Barun O Kiranmala, a Bengali Fantasy film.
 Arun Garg (born 1946), an Indo-Canadian physician in British Columbia who is recognized for contributing linkages between Canada and India.
 Arun Krishnamurthy (born 1986), an Indian environmental activist who initiated campaign cleaning various lakes across India.
 Arun Kumar Chanda (1899–1947), an Indian independence activist from Cachar district of Assam.
 Arun Luthra, a jazz musician (saxophonist, konnakol artist, composer and arranger) based in New York City.
 Arun Maira (born 1943), a management consultant and former member of Planning Commission of India.
 Arun Manilal Gandhi, an Indian-American socio-political activist, and the fifth grandson of Gandhi.
 Arun Netravali (born 1946), an Indian-American computer engineer credited with major contributions in digital technology including HDTV.
 Arun Sadhu (born 1942), a writer and a freelance journalist from Maharashtra, India.
 Tushar Arun Gandhi, son of journalist Arun Manilal Gandhi, grandson of Manilal Gandhi and great-grandson of Mahatma Gandhi.

See also
Arun (disambiguation)
Aaron
Kumar

References

Indian masculine given names